Domenico Carpentieri (born 23 February 1946) was an Italian male racewalker who competed at the 1972 Summer Olympics.

See also
 Italian team at the running events
 Italy at the IAAF World Race Walking Cup

References

External links
 

1946 births
Living people
Athletes (track and field) at the 1972 Summer Olympics
Italian male racewalkers
Olympic athletes of Italy
Athletics competitors of Fiamme Gialle
20th-century Italian people